Kohneh Deh Shugai (also Romanized as Kohneh Deh Shūgāī) is a village in Kani Bazar Rural District, Khalifan District, Mahabad County, West Azerbaijan Province, Iran. At the 2006 census, its population was 172, in 22 families.

References 

Populated places in Mahabad County